Neocoelidiinae is a small subfamily in the family Cicadellidae (leafhoppers). It was originally included within the subfamily Coelidiinae.

Description
Neocoelidiinae are easily recognisable by their very long antennae and distinctive head shape. Many species are incredibly vibrant and are most diverse in the neotropics. There are some species found in the neararctic region, specifically in the genus Neocoelidia.

Tribes and Genera
There are two tribes in the subfamily, one being recently described in 2012. These species are confined to the New World.

Genera considered members of the subfamily Neocoelidiinae are listed below.

Krocodonini
A South American tribe, created by Marques-Costa & Cavichioli in 2012.
 Krocarites Dietrich & Vega, 1995
 Krocodona Kramer, 1964
 Krocolidia Dietrich, 2003
 Krocozzota Kramer, 1964
 Retrolidia Dietrich, 2003

Neocoelidiini
The larger tribe of the subfamily. 
 Acocoelidia DeLong, 1953
 Aglenita Spinola, 1850
 Biza Walker, F., 1858
 Chinaia Bruner & Metcalf, 1934
 Chinchinota Kramer, 1967
 Cocoelidia DeLong, 1953
 Coelana Kramer, 1964
 Coelella DeLong, 1953
 Coelidiana Oman, 1938
 Coelindroma Kramer, 1967
 Coronalidia Marques-Costa & Cavichioli, 2007
 Deltocoelidia Kramer, 1961
 Megacoelidia Kramer & Linnavuori, 1959
 Nelidina DeLong, 1953
 Neocoelidia Gillette & Baker, 1895
 Neocoelidiana DeLong, 1953
 Neocoelindroma Marques-Costa & Cavichioli, 2007
 Paracoelidiana Marques-Costa & Cavichioli, 2007
 Paraphysiana Bortolli-Chiamolera, Cavichioli & Anderle, 2003
 Placoscopana Gonçalves, Marques-Costa & Ale-Rocha, 2012
 Salvina Melichar, 1926
 Scopocoelidia Marques-Costa & Cavichioli, 2007
 Tetralidia Marques-Costa & Cavichioli, 2008
 Tichocoelidia Kramer, 1962
 Tozzita Kramer, 1964
 Xenocoelidia Kramer, 1959
 Xenocoelidiana Marques-Costa & Cavichioli, 2006
 Xiqilliba Kramer, 1964

References

External links
 database of observations in the U.S. and Canada
 public database of observations

 
Cicadellidae